Hevel Eilot Regional Council (Mo'atza Azorit Hevel Eilot) is a regional council in the Southern District of Israel, near the city of Eilat.  It is the southernmost regional council in Israel.

Only about 5,300 people live in the council in twelve communities.  Its area is about 2.2 million dunams.  The major city of the region, Eilat, governs itself as a city council and is not included in the regional council.

History 
Hevel Eilot Regional Council was established in 1964.

In the ceremony participated the General Director of the Ministry of the Interior, the Chairman of the Tamar Regional Council, the Chairman of the Lachish Regional Council and other guests. The area of the regional council was then about two million dunams and was the largest jurisdiction in Israel and had only 250 residents. It then encompassed the localities of Eilot, Yotvata and Grofit.

Geography
The jurisdiction of Hevel Eilot Regional Council is covered by the following borders:

 North: Central Arava Regional Council
 East: Jordan
 South: Eilat
 West: Egypt and the central Negev

Hevel Eilot is a region of arid desert.  There is little precipitation in the winter, and summer temperatures rise above 40 degrees Celsius (104 Fahrenheit).  The flora and fauna are typical for the desert.

Timna Park is a nature reserve that covers a large area in the region.

The region is home to the first commercial solar field in Israel, built by Arava Power Company, located at Kibbutz Ketura.

The region, which is far away from central Israel, is not connected to the national water supply system.  Instead, the drinking and irrigation water is derived from desalination of water from the Red Sea.

Communities in the council

There are 13 communities in the council: 10 kibbutzim and three community settlements.

Kibbutzim 
 Eilot (אילות)
 Elifaz (אליפז)
 Grofit (גרופית)
 Ketura (קטורה)
 Lotan (לוטן)
 Neot Smadar (נאות סמדר)
 Neve Harif (נווה חריף)
 Samar (סמר)
 Yotvata (יטבתה)
 Yahel (יהל)

Community settlements 
 Be'er Ora (באר אורה)
 Shaharut (שחרות)
Shitim (שיטים)

External links
 Hevel Eilot Regional Council homepage

References 

 
Regional councils in Israel
1964 establishments in Israel